Poonch House is a mansion in Rawalpindi, Pakistan. It was constructed by a ruler of Poonch jagir, Raja Moti Singh, in 1897 as a rest house. In 1914, it got taken over the by the state of Jammu and Kashmir, and, in 1947, by the provisional governrment of Azad Kashmir. It served as the office for the Prime Minister of Azad Kashmir, until a permanent office in Muzaffarabad was established.

It has been used as a rest house for kings and princes of Kashmir.

References

Houses in Pakistan
Rawalpindi District
1897 establishments in British India
Prime Ministers of Azad Kashmir